The weka, also known as the Māori hen or woodhen (Gallirallus australis) is a flightless bird species of the rail family. It is endemic to New Zealand. It is the only extant member of the genus Gallirallus. Four subspecies are recognized but only two (northern/southern) are supported by genetic evidence.

The weka are sturdy brown birds, about the size of a chicken. As omnivores, they feed mainly on invertebrates and fruit. Weka usually lay eggs between August and January; both sexes help to incubate.

Description
Weka are large rails. They are predominantly rich brown mottled with black and grey; the brown shade varies from pale to dark depending on subspecies. Females measure  in length and weigh .

The pointed tail is near-constantly being flicked, a sign of unease characteristic of the rail family. Weka have sturdy legs and reduced wings.

Taxonomy and distribution
The common name, "weka", is a Māori word. The species was named Rallus australis by Anders Erikson Sparrman in 1789. Sparrman published the information in Museum Carlsonianum, four fascicules based on specimens collected while voyaging with Captain James Cook between 1772 and 1775. Australis is Latin for "southern". Johann Georg Wagler's suggestion of the genus Ocydromus in 1830 to describe each weka as a species was generally adopted. However, weka were later classified as a single species in the genus Gallirallus with four subspecies.

The buff weka (Gallirallus australis hectori) formerly inhabited the eastern districts of the South Island but is now confined to Chatham Island and Pitt Island to which it was introduced in the early 1900s, and where they are widely hunted and eaten in the autumn (accepted because they are introduced).

Reintroduction into Canterbury has been unsuccessful so far but introductions to Mao Waho Island (in Lake Wanaka in 2004) and from there to Pigeon and Pig Island (in Lake Wakatipu in 2005/2006) have been much more successful. It has a lighter overall colouring than the other subspecies. The North Island weka (Gallirallus australis greyi)  is represented by original populations in Northland and Poverty Bay, and by liberations elsewhere from that stock. This subspecies differs in its greyer underparts, and brown rather than reddish coloured legs.

The western weka (Gallirallus australis australis) is found mainly in the northern and western regions of the South Island from Nelson to Fiordland. Distinguished by dark red-brown and black streaking on the breast, the western weka has two distinct colour phases, that of the southernmost range showing a greater degree of black.  The Stewart Island weka (Gallirallus australis scotti) is smaller than the other subspecies and, like the western weka, has two colour phases; a chestnut form – similar to the chestnut-phase western weka – and a black phase which is not as dark as the black western weka. Reintroduced populations are confined to Stewart Island/Rakiura and outliers, and to Kapiti Island to which it was introduced. Weka are host to two species of feather lice (Rallicola harrisoni and Pseudomenopon pilgrimi) which show the same north–south population structure seen in their hosts.

Behaviour

Habitat and diet

Weka occupy areas such as forests, sub-alpine grassland, sand dunes, rocky shores and modified semi-urban environments. They are omnivorous, with a diet comprising 30% animal foods and 70% plant foods. Animal foods include earthworms, larvae, beetles, wētā, ants, grass grubs, slugs, snails, insect eggs, slaters, frogs, spiders, rats, mice, and small birds. Stewart Island weka (G. a. scotti) have been observed preying on sooty shearwater (Puffinus griseus) eggs and chicks.

Plant foods include leaves, grass, berries and seeds. Weka are important in the bush as seed dispersers, distributing seeds too large for smaller berry-eating birds. Where the weka is relatively common, their furtive curiosity leads them to search around houses and camps for food scraps, or anything unfamiliar and transportable. They have been known to take shiny objects in particular.

Breeding and nesting

The breeding season varies, but when food is plentiful, weka can raise up to four broods throughout the whole year. Nests are made on the ground under the cover of thick vegetation, and built by making grass (or similar material) into a bowl to hold about four eggs. On average, female weka lay three creamy or pinkish eggs blotched with brown and mauve. Both sexes incubate. The chicks hatch after a month, and are fed by both parents until fully grown between six and ten weeks.

Conservation status
Weka are classed as a vulnerable species. The Department of Conservation's weka recovery plan, approved in 1999, aims to improve the conservation status of threatened weka, clarify the status of data deficient weka, maintain the non-threatened status of other weka, and eventually restore all weka to their traditional ranges as a significant component of the ecosystems.

Weka are problematic in conservation; some subspecies are threatened, but have been a problem to other threatened wildlife on offshore islands, especially when introduced to an island that they would not naturally inhabit. Weka are unable to withstand the current pressures faced in both the North Island and South Island. However, they can be very productive in good conditions and high food availability. Year-round breeding has been recorded at several sites with up to 14 young produced in a year. Weka populations can persist in highly modified habitats, but they have disappeared from huge areas of their former range, suggesting that they can adapt to a wide range of conditions but are particularly vulnerable to threats.

Threats

The Department of Conservation identifies eight main threats to weka. Predation by ferrets, cats, and dogs are a threat to adult weka; stoats and ferrets are a threat to chicks; stoats and rats are a threat to eggs. It faces competition with introduced species for fruits and invertebrates, and suffers from the impact browsers have on forest composition and regeneration. Habitat depletion is caused by the modification and degradation of forests and wetlands. Diseases and parasites have been associated with population declines, although little is known. Drought has been implicated in the disappearance of weka from some areas. In some regions, motor vehicles cause a significant amount of roadkill death. Pest control operations sometimes kill weka, as they have ground foraging habits vulnerable to poison baits, and traps are laid in a way that weka can reach. Genetic diversity can be lost during the transmission of genes through generations, affecting isolated populations.

Human interaction
Weka are significant to some Māori iwi (tribes) who admire their curiosity and feisty, bold personality traits which have led to them being relatively easy to catch. Weka were used by the Māori as a source of food, perfume, oil to treat inflammations, feathers in clothing and lures to catch dogs. Early European explorers and settlers frequently encountered and utilised weka; they were called "bush hens".

References

External links

BirdLife Species Factsheet.

Endemic birds of New Zealand
Flightless birds
Gallirallus
Birds described in 1786
Taxa named by Anders Sparrman